Nicotiana glauca is a species of flowering plant in the tobacco genus Nicotiana of the nightshade family Solanaceae. It is known by the common name tree tobacco. Its leaves are attached to the stalk by petioles (many other Nicotiana species have sessile leaves), and its leaves and stems are neither pubescent nor sticky like Nicotiana tabacum. It resembles Cestrum parqui but differs in the form of leaves and fusion of the outer floral parts. It grows to heights of more than two meters.

Tree tobacco is native to South America but it is now widespread as an introduced species on other continents. It is a common roadside weed in the southwestern United States, and an invasive plant species in California native plant habitats.

Description
Nicotiana glauca is a small tree or shrub with many branches that normally grows to over 2 m, but can reach as high as 7 m. Its leaves are thick and rubbery and can be up to 20 cm long. It has yellow tubular flowers about 5 cm long and 1 cm wide. The plant primarily reproduces by seed.

Ecology
Nicotiana glauca can pose a threat to native species by outcompeting them for resources and is classified as an invasive species in many parts of the world. In some management programmes, the beetle Malabris aculeata has been successfully deployed as a biological control agent. Every part of the plant is potentially poisonous to humans and livestock.

Distribution
It is originally native to South America (including Colombia, Argentina, Chile, Paraguay, Uruguay, Brazil, Venezuela, Bolivia, Peru, and Ecuador), but has been naturalized globally. It is found in Australia, warmer parts of Europe, temperate Asia, Canarian Archipelago, New Zealand, the United States, Mexico, Hawaii, and Sub-Saharan Africa (including Kenya and Tanzania, where it is invasive, as well as Uganda).

It grows in a wide variety of open and disturbed habitats including lakeshores and roadsides, but is mainly a problem in relatively dry areas.

Names
The plant is commonly known in English as tree tobacco, Brazilian tree tobacco, shrub tobacco, wild tobacco, tobacco tree, tobacco bush, tobacco plant, and mustard tree. It is also known as blaugrüner Tabak ("blue-green tobacco") in German.

In Spanish and throughout Latin America, it is known by many names including: tabaco moro ("Moorish tobacco"),  palancho, and palán palán.

Its botanical name, Nicotiana glauca, was given to it in 1828 by Robert Graham. The genus is named after Jean Nicot (c.1530-1600), a French ambassador to Portugal, who sent tobacco seeds and powdered leaves from Lisbon to France.

Phylogeny
There are around 76 species in the Nicotiana genus, the sole member of the Nicotianeae tribe. Phylogenetic research suggests the following species are closely related:

Uses
The plant is used for a variety of medicinal purposes and smoked by Native American groups. The Cahuilla people used leaves interchangeably with other tobacco species in hunting rituals and as a poultice to treat swellings, bruises, cuts, wounds, boils, sores, inflamed throat, and swollen glands. It contains the toxic alkaloid anabasine and ingestion of the leaves can be fatal. It is being investigated for use as a biofuel.

References

External links

glauca
Flora of southern South America
Flora of western South America
Tobacco
Medicinal plants of South America
Energy crops
Crops originating from Argentina
Crops originating from Brazil
Crops originating from Bolivia
Crops originating from Chile
Crops originating from Ecuador
Crops originating from Peru
Crops originating from Paraguay
Crops originating from Uruguay
Crops originating from the Americas
Taxa described in 1828
Taxa named by Robert Graham